Chahar Tang-e Qalandari (also Romanized as Chahār Tang-e Qalanadrī; also known as Chahār Tang and Chehār Tang) is a village in Ludab Rural District, Ludab District, Boyer-Ahmad County, Kohgiluyeh and Boyer-Ahmad Province, Iran. At the 2006 census, its population was 88, in 19 families.

References 

Populated places in Boyer-Ahmad County